Sindères is a former commune in the Landes department in Nouvelle-Aquitaine in southwestern France. On 1 January 2019, it was merged into the new commune Morcenx-la-Nouvelle.

Population

See also
Communes of the Landes department

References

Former communes of Landes (department)